The 1998–99 NCAA Division III men's ice hockey season began in October 1998 and concluded on March 20 of the following year. This was the 26th season of Division III college ice hockey.

Division II Findlay joined with 4 Division III schools to form the MCHA. After the season the Oilers jumped up to Division I but were allowed to immediately participate in postseason tournament because they officially remained a D-II program.

Regular season

Season tournaments

Standings

Note: Mini-game are not included in final standings

1999 NCAA tournament

Note: * denotes overtime period(s)

See also
 1998–99 NCAA Division I men's ice hockey season
 1998–99 NCAA Division II men's ice hockey season

References

External links

 
NCAA